Ed Harrington (February 8, 1941 – November 26, 2011) was a star defensive lineman in the Canadian Football League.

Harrington played college football at Langston University and later with the Toronto Rifles of the Continental Football League. He had a 10-year career in the Canadian Football League from 1963 to 1974 for the Toronto Argonauts.  He was a CFL All-Star three times. His name was put in the All-time Argos on September 19, 2010.

Personal
During his career, Harrington worked with various community organization in Toronto including Physical Director of the Toronto YMCA. After football, he worked at the Ontario Ombudsman Office (1974–1986), patient advocate at psychiatric hospitals in Whitby and North Bay.

Harrington died in Field, Ontario of cancer and survived by wife Terryl.

References

External links
Career bio

1941 births
2011 deaths
American players of Canadian football
Canadian football defensive linemen
Continental Football League players
Langston Lions football players
People from Choctaw County, Oklahoma
Players of American football from Oklahoma
Toronto Argonauts players